Felina: Prinsesa ng mga Pusa (Princess of The Cats), the first afternoon series back to back with Isang Dakot na Luha offered by TV5, first aired on February 27, 2012, with Arci Muñoz in her first lead role. It was originally supposed to have premiered in October 2011.

Synopsis

This is the unique story of a woman who was born with cat looks/cat like abilities. Cursed by her own father and raised by her non biological mother. Her life was filled with miseries and hardships. She had to face the painful reality that it's hard for a human-cat to seek love. This is the life experience of our latest protagonist in the world of fantasy/drama. This is the life of Felina.

Cast and characters

Main cast
Arci Muñoz as Felina
Leandro Muñoz as Joaquin 
Ahron Villena as Yohann
Carla Humphries as Chloe

Supporting cast
Pilita Corrales as Madam Corziva
Bing Loyzaga as Greta 
Jestoni Alarcon as Emilo
Angel Jacob as Celestina
Sharmaine Suarez as Agatha
Racquel Montessa as Donya Regina 
Epi Quizon as Turko 
Carlos Morales as Hugo
Bearwin Meily as Mang Porky
CJ Jaravata as Sugar
BJ Go as Pinggoy
Lilia Cuntapay† as Madam Lucilla
Gardo Versoza as Arvin
Iwa Moto  as  Liza Golvez

Guest cast
Nathaniel Britt as Cameo Role
Francis Magundayao as Teen Joaquin
Zymic Jaranilla as Young Joaquin
Dexie Daulat as Young Chloe

See also
List of programs broadcast by TV5 (Philippines)
List of shows previously aired by TV5

References

TV5 (Philippine TV network) drama series
2012 Philippine television series debuts
2012 Philippine television series endings
Philippine drama television series
Fantaserye and telefantasya
Filipino-language television shows